Te Teko is a small inland town along the banks of the Rangitaiki River in the Bay of Plenty region of New Zealand's North Island.

The township includes a racecourse, golf course, police station, and a primary school.  The primary school was established in 1881.

Te Hoko is in the rohe (tribal area) of the Ngāti Awa iwi.

History and culture

History

In the mid-1860s, Te Teko was the site of a significant siege on a Māori pā as part of the East Cape War.

After peace came to the region, a hotel was established on the banks of the Rangitaiki River in 1879 and Te Teko rose in importance as a boat service was established to ferry hotel customers and travellers across the river.  A bridge made the boat service redundant in 1915.

Marae

Te Teko has several marae, which are meeting grounds for Ngāti Awa hapū:

 Kokohinau or Tuhimata Marae and O Ruataupare meeting house are affiliated with Te Pahipoto.
 Te Māpou Marae and Rongotangiawa meeting house are affiliated with Ngāti Hāmua.
 Ruaihona Marae and Ruaihona meeting house are affiliated with Ngāi Tamaoki.
 Tuariki Marae and Tuariki meeting house are affiliated with Tuariki.
 Tūteao Marae and Tūteao meeting house are affiliated with Ngā Maihi.
 Uiraroa Marae and Uiraroa meeting house are affiliated with Ngāi Tamawera.

In October 2020, the Government committed $4,871,246 from the Provincial Growth Fund to upgrade a group of 12 marae, including Ruaihona, Tuariki, Tūteao and Uiraroa Marae, creating 23 jobs. It also committed $500,000 to upgrade Te Māpou Marae, creating 6.2 jobs.

Demographics
Te Teko is part of the larger Te Teko Lakes statistical area.

Te Teko had a population of 444 at the 2018 New Zealand census, an increase of 105 people (31.0%) since the 2013 census, and a decrease of 3 people (−0.7%) since the 2006 census. There were 111 households, comprising 222 males and 219 females, giving a sex ratio of 1.01 males per female, with 129 people (29.1%) aged under 15 years, 114 (25.7%) aged 15 to 29, 168 (37.8%) aged 30 to 64, and 27 (6.1%) aged 65 or older.

Ethnicities were 18.9% European/Pākehā, 93.2% Māori, 5.4% Pacific peoples, and 0.7% Asian. People may identify with more than one ethnicity.

Although some people chose not to answer the census's question about religious affiliation, 33.8% had no religion, 20.3% were Christian, 39.2% had Māori religious beliefs and 0.7% had other religions.

Of those at least 15 years old, 24 (7.6%) people had a bachelor's or higher degree, and 66 (21.0%) people had no formal qualifications. 18 people (5.7%) earned over $70,000 compared to 17.2% nationally. The employment status of those at least 15 was that 111 (35.2%) people were employed full-time, 39 (12.4%) were part-time, and 48 (15.2%) were unemployed.

Te Teko Lakes statistical area

Te Teko Lakes had a population of 1,758 at the 2018 New Zealand census, an increase of 309 people (21.3%) since the 2013 census, and an increase of 51 people (3.0%) since the 2006 census. There were 465 households, comprising 870 males and 888 females, giving a sex ratio of 0.98 males per female. The median age was 32.9 years (compared with 37.4 years nationally), with 435 people (24.7%) aged under 15 years, 396 (22.5%) aged 15 to 29, 747 (42.5%) aged 30 to 64, and 183 (10.4%) aged 65 or older.

Ethnicities were 36.0% European/Pākehā, 78.8% Māori, 3.4% Pacific peoples, 2.0% Asian, and 0.5% other ethnicities. People may identify with more than one ethnicity.

The percentage of people born overseas was 4.9, compared with 27.1% nationally.

Although some people chose not to answer the census's question about religious affiliation, 36.7% had no religion, 21.3% were Christian, 31.7% had Māori religious beliefs, 0.2% were Buddhist and 1.7% had other religions.

Of those at least 15 years old, 132 (10.0%) people had a bachelor's or higher degree, and 318 (24.0%) people had no formal qualifications. The median income was $19,800, compared with $31,800 nationally. 120 people (9.1%) earned over $70,000 compared to 17.2% nationally. The employment status of those at least 15 was that 516 (39.0%) people were employed full-time, 189 (14.3%) were part-time, and 135 (10.2%) were unemployed.

Geography

The Rangitaiki River passes through the town as it flows northwards to its mouth on the Pacific Ocean, and State Highways 30 and 34 meet in the town.  SH 30 cuts through the town on its route from Whakatane to Rotorua, while SH 34 crosses it in the town's west and runs southwest to Kawerau.  To the west of the town runs the East Coast Main Trunk Railway, and from it diverges the Murupara Branch line, which skirts the south of Te Teko.

Te Teko has the highest mean daily maximum temperature (20.26 °C) of any settlement in New Zealand, although it is not the warmest town in New Zealand as the mean daily minimum temperature of 8.56 °C is comparatively low. Rainfall is high, averaging 1474mm per year.

Education

References

Whakatane District
Populated places in the Bay of Plenty Region